The Tornado is a 1924 American silent drama film directed by King Baggot and starring House Peters, Ruth Clifford, and Richard Tucker.

Plot
As described in a review in a film magazine, grim and severe, but with a kindly heart, the boss of the lumber camp (Peters) was known as Tornado. Returning to his shack in the village, he sees Ruth Travers (Clifford), the girl he has come to the wilderness to forget, and her husband Ross (Tucker). Ruth sends word by her husband that she must see Tornado, but the husband lies to keep them apart. Tornado, learning the couple are unhappy, reaches the hotel in time to prevent Ruth from being beaten by her husband, and tells her the story of his perfidy, how he left Tornado to die in France, lied about him, and finally won Ruth. The Travers' start to leave on an early train, but a cyclone comes up. The storm causes a log jam, and flood waters damage houses in the camp. Tornado manages to break the log jam and save the town, but the logs pile against the bridge and destroy it as the train is going over. Tornado saves Ruth and goes back for her husband, but it is too late to save him.

Cast

Preservation
A complete print of The Tornado is held by the EYE Film Institute Netherlands.

References

Bibliography
 Munden, Kenneth White. The American Film Institute Catalog of Motion Pictures Produced in the United States, Part 1. University of California Press, 1997.

External links

 

1924 films
1924 drama films
1920s English-language films
American silent feature films
Silent American drama films
American black-and-white films
Films directed by King Baggot
Universal Pictures films
1920s American films